Albert Percy Hough (1877–1960), was an English bowls player who competed in the 1930 British Empire Games.

Bowls career
At the 1930 British Empire Games he won the gold medal in the rinks (fours) event with Ernie Gudgeon, James Frith and James Edney.

Personal life
He was a law accountant by trade and lived in Newcastle upon Tyne. He married Florence Selina Shepherd.

References

English male bowls players
Bowls players at the 1930 British Empire Games
Commonwealth Games gold medallists for England
Commonwealth Games medallists in lawn bowls
1877 births
1960 deaths
Medallists at the 1930 British Empire Games